Karen Johnson Williams (August 4, 1951 – November 2, 2013) was a United States circuit judge of the United States Court of Appeals for the Fourth Circuit, appointed in 1992 and served as its Chief Judge from 2007 until her retirement in 2009. Williams was mentioned as a potential nominee to the United States Supreme Court during the administration of George W. Bush.

Education and career

Born in Orangeburg, South Carolina, Williams received her Bachelor of Arts degree from Columbia College in 1972 and a Juris Doctor from the University of South Carolina School of Law in 1980. She was in private practice in Orangeburg from 1980 to 1992.

Federal judicial service

On January 27, 1992, Williams was nominated by President George H. W. Bush to a seat on the United States Court of Appeals for the Fourth Circuit vacated by Judge Robert F. Chapman. She was confirmed by the United States Senate on February 27, 1992, and received her commission on March 2, 1992. She served as its chief judge from 2007 to 2009.

Illness and retirement

Williams assumed senior status due to a certified disability on July 8, 2009 after being diagnosed with early-onset Alzheimer's disease. She stated her desire to leave the bench while still able to perform her judicial duties, so that her future decisions would not be questioned because of her illness. She died on November 2, 2013.

See also
George W. Bush Supreme Court candidates

References

Sources
 

1951 births
2013 deaths
Columbia College (South Carolina) alumni
Deaths from Alzheimer's disease
Deaths from dementia in South Carolina
Judges of the United States Court of Appeals for the Fourth Circuit
People from Orangeburg, South Carolina
United States court of appeals judges appointed by George H. W. Bush
20th-century American judges
University of South Carolina School of Law alumni
20th-century American women judges